Sendamangalam is a neighbourhood in Namakkal district, Tamil Nadu, India.

Sendamangalam may also refer to:
 Sendamangalam town
 Sendamangalam block
 Sendamangalam taluk 
 Senthamangalam (state assembly constituency)